Krishna Kanta Handique (20 July 1898 – 7 June 1982) was a Sanskrit scholar, an Indologist and philanthropist from Assam. He was a recipient of the civilian honour of the Padma Shri and Padma Bhushan.

Biography
Krishna Kanta Handique was born on 20 July 1898 in a Tai-Ahom family in Jorhat town of Assam, to Rai-Bahadur Radha Kanta Handique. He was  educated at Cotton College, Guwahati (1913–15), Sanskrit College, Calcutta (1915–17), Calcutta University (1917–19), Oxford University, Paris University and Berlin University (1920–27). He also studied and learned many languages like Latin, Greek, French, German, Russian, Italian and Spanish. He is known to have known 13 languages: 8 European languages and 5 Indian languages including Pali and Prakrit.

Handique was the founder Vice-Chancellor of Gauhati University for nine years (1948–57). Prior to this he was the founder Principal of J.B. College, Jorhat (1930–48) and established the Hemalata Handique Memorial Institute in Jorhat. He is well known for his munificence to literary and educational foundations. He bequeathed his massive personal library to Guwahati University making available to the public rare and valuable books in 11 languages of the world. He also gave the copyright of all his books to Deccan College PG & Research Institute, Pune; The Jaina Samskriti Samrakshaka Sangh, Maharashtra and Prakrit Test Society, Ahmedabad.

Krishna Kanta Handique was the President of Asam Sahitya Sabha during the Guwahati conference in 1937 at the young age of 39, President of Classical Sanskrit Section, XVI All India Oriental Conference, Lucknow in 1951 and was elected the general President of the Srinagar Session of the same in 1961.

The Indian Posts and Telegraphs Dept. issued a commemorative stamp in honor of Handique on 7 October 1983. The Govt of Assam has instituted the prestigious Krishna Kanta Handique Memorial Award in his honour in the field of promotion of Sanskrit language and literature.

Handique was posthumously awarded the Sahitya Akademi Award in 1985 for his book Krishnakanta Handiqui Rachana Sambhar, a collection of 20 critical essays. For its critical insight and analytical approach, the work has been regarded as a significant contribution to contemporary Assamese literature.

Works
Handique, the Sanskrit scholar is known for his three major works:
 Naisadhacarita of Sriharsa, 1934
 Yaśastilaka and Indian Culture 1949 (on Yashastilaka)
 Pravarasena's Setubandha 1976

References

Indian Indologists
People from Jorhat district
Asom Sahitya Sabha Presidents
Cotton College, Guwahati alumni
The Sanskrit College and University alumni
University of Calcutta alumni
Indian Sanskrit scholars
1898 births
1982 deaths
Place of death missing
Recipients of the Padma Bhushan in literature & education
Recipients of the Sahitya Akademi Award in Assamese
20th-century Indian scholars
Recipients of the Padma Shri in literature & education
Scholars from Assam
Academic staff of Gauhati University